Nathan's Famous, Inc. is an American company that operates a chain of fast food restaurants specializing in hot dogs. The original Nathan's restaurant stands at the corner of Surf and Stillwell Avenues in the Coney Island neighborhood of the Brooklyn borough of New York City, New York. The company's headquarters are at One Jericho Plaza in Jericho, New York, part of Oyster Bay, New York.

History

Nathan's began as a nickel hot dog stand in Coney Island in 1916 and bears the name of its co-founder Nathan Handwerker (1892 – 1974), who started the business with his wife, Ida Handwerker, née Greenwald. Ida created the hot dog recipe they used, and Ida's grandmother created the secret spice recipe. Because Nathan's Famous all-beef hot dogs lacked rabbinic supervision and the meat wasn't kosher, Handwerker coined the term "kosher style" because the hot dogs were not made from pork or horsemeat.

Handwerker was a Jewish-Polish immigrant who arrived in New York City in 1912 and soon found work at the Coney Island, Brooklyn, restaurant Feltman's German Gardens. By one account, he was encouraged by singing waiters Eddie Cantor and Jimmy Durante to go into business in competition with Feltman's; as United Press International noted in 1974, "There are many stories about Nathan and how the business began, but this is the way he told it..." The company's official history does not mention the future stars' encouragement. Nathan and Ida spent their life savings of $300 (worth about $7,000 as of May 2018, accounting for inflation) to begin the business.

Handwerker undercut Feltman's by charging five cents for a hot dog when his former employer was charging 10 cents. At a time when food regulation was in its infancy and the pedigree of the hot dog particularly suspect, Handwerker ensured that men wearing surgeon's smocks were seen eating at his stand to reassure potential customers. The business proved immensely popular.

The expansion of the chain was overseen by Nathan Handwerker's son, Murray Handwerker. A second branch on Long Beach Road in Oceanside, New York, opened in 1959, and another debuted in Yonkers, New York, in 1965.  Murray Handwerker was named the president of Nathan's Famous in 1968, the year the company went public.

All locations were sold by the Handwerker family to a group of private investors in 1987, at which point Nathan's was franchised and a great number of establishments were opened around New York City and beyond. In the 1990s, the company acquired Kenny Rogers Roasters and Miami Subs Grill, both of which were later divested.

, the company consisted of 24 company-owned units, 380 franchised or licensed units and more than 1,400 stores in 50 states, Guam, the District of Columbia, and 17 foreign countries, including Kandahar Airfield, Afghanistan. One unit was lost due to the collapse of 2 World Trade Center in the 9/11 attacks.

International master franchise agreements were signed (circa 2006) with Egypt and Israel. The company also owns the exclusive co-branding rights to the Arthur Treacher's Fish and Chips chain.

On March 28, 2017, it was announced that Nathan's Famous had reached a sponsorship deal with Major League Baseball, allowing the company to market itself as the official hot dog brand of the league. While Nathan's is already the official hot dog brand of the New York Mets, New York Yankees, Miami Marlins, and St. Louis Cardinals (the sponsorship does not restrict teams from making similar deals with competitors), the deal marked the first time that Major League Baseball had named an official hot dog sponsor.

Nathan's hotdogs are primarily manufactured by Smithfield Foods, a subsidiary of China's WH Group.

In 2002, Home Depot and Nathan's terminated a co-locating partnership which offered Nathan's space within certain Home Depot stores in New York.

Original location
, the original Nathan's hot dog stand still exists at its original 1916 site.  Having been open for business every day, 365 days a year, the stand was forced to close on October 29, 2012, due to Hurricane Sandy. The shop re-opened six months later, on May 21, despite a small fire on May 4, 2013. Service is provided year-round inside, and during the summer additional walk-up windows are opened to serve the larger seasonal crowds.  The original location still features fried frog legs, which have been a Nathan's menu item since the 1950s.  It is not offered at any other Nathan's locations. Nathan's also operates a second, smaller location nearby on the Coney Island boardwalk.

Hot dog eating contest

The Nathan's Hot Dog Eating Contest has been held annually at the original location on Coney Island since the early 1970s on the 4th of July. Contestants try to consume as many hot dogs as possible in 10 minutes. Winners include Takeru Kobayashi (2001–2006), Joey Chestnut (2007–2014, 2016–2022) and Miki Sudo (women's 2014–2018). In 2008, Chestnut tied Kobayashi after eating 59 hot dogs and buns in 10 minutes. The tie resulted in a five hot dog eat-off, which Chestnut won by consuming all five before Kobayashi. In 2018, Chestnut consumed 74 hot dogs and buns for a new world record.

See also
 Coney Island hot dog
 Kosher style
 List of hot dog restaurants
 List of New York companies

References

Further reading
 
 Christoff, Chris (April 1, 2014). "Detroit’s Coney Island Hot Dogs Are Edible Solace for City". Bloomberg.

 .
 .
 
 
 Yung, Katherine and Joe Grimm (2012). Coney Detroit. Detroit, Michigan: Wayne State University Press. .

External links

 
 A tribute to Nathan's in Oceanside, New York
Sol Handwerker Interview - Nathan's son recounts growing up in the family business - conducted: August 1 2007 by Coney Island History Project
Oral History of Nathan's Famous - CIHP

1916 establishments in New York City
Brand name hot dogs
Companies based in Nassau County, New York
Companies listed on the Nasdaq
Coney Island
Fast-food chains of the United States
Hot dog restaurants
Jews and Judaism in Brooklyn
Kosher style
Oyster Bay (town), New York
Restaurants established in 1916
Restaurants in Brooklyn